This article provides details on candidates for the 2015 New South Wales state election, held on 28 March 2015.

Retiring members

Labor
Richard Amery MLA (Mount Druitt) — announced 11 August 2014
Cherie Burton MLA (Kogarah) — announced 6 November 2013
Barry Collier MLA (Miranda) — announced 17 October 2014
Robert Furolo MLA (Lakemba) — announced 8 August 2014
Andrew McDonald MLA (Macquarie Fields) — announced 18 September 2014
Barbara Perry MP (Auburn) — announced 7 January 2015
Nathan Rees MLA (Toongabbie) — announced 28 March 2014
Carmel Tebbutt MLA (Marrickville) — announced 3 November 2013
Amanda Fazio MLC — announced 30 June 2014

Liberal
Barry O'Farrell MLA (Ku-ring-gai) — announced 24 November 2014
Robyn Parker MLA (Maitland) — announced 16 October 2014
Greg Smith MLA (Epping) — announced 16 July 2014
Charlie Lynn MLC — announced 2014

National
Don Page MLA (Ballina) — announced 22 April 2014
George Souris MLA (Upper Hunter) — announced 27 September 2014
Andrew Stoner MLA (Oxley) — announced 15 October 2014
Jenny Gardiner MLC — announced 16 February 2014

Independent
Bart Bassett MLA (Londonderry) — elected as Liberal, did not recontest
Craig Baumann MLA (Port Stephens) — elected as Liberal, announced 10 December 2014
Chris Hartcher MLA (Terrigal) — elected as Liberal, announced 15 October 2014
Chris Spence MLA (The Entrance) — elected as Liberal, announced 10 June 2014
Darren Webber MLA (Wyong) — elected as Liberal, announced 10 June 2014
Marie Ficarra MLC — elected as Liberal, delivered valedictory 19 November 2014

Legislative Assembly
Sitting members are shown in bold text. Successful candidates are highlighted in the relevant colour. Where there is possible confusion, an asterisk (*) is also used.

Legislative Council
Sitting members are shown in bold text. Tickets that elected at least one MLC are highlighted in the relevant colour. Successful candidates are identified by an asterisk (*).

Half of the Legislative Council was not up for re-election. This included six Liberal members (David Clarke, Catherine Cusack, Scot MacDonald, Natasha Maclaren-Jones, Greg Pearce and Peter Phelps), five Labor members (Greg Donnelly, Peter Primrose, Penny Sharpe, Steve Whan and Ernest Wong), four Nationals members (Niall Blair, Rick Colless, Duncan Gay and Sarah Mitchell), three Greens members (Jan Barham, Jeremy Buckingham and David Shoebridge), one Christian Democrats member (Paul Green), one Shooters and Fishers member (Robert Brown) and one ex-Liberal independent (Mike Gallacher).

The Labor Party was defending nine seats. The Liberal-National Coalition was defending eight seats. The Greens were defending two seats. The Christian Democratic Party and the Shooters and Fishers Party were each defending one seat.

Unregistered parties and groups
The Arts Party endorsed PJ Collins in the Legislative Council, who was an ungrouped candidate.
The Australia First Party endorsed Tania Rollinson in Hawkesbury, Victor Waterson in Penrith and Alex Norwick in Wyong.
The Centre Party endorsed Joanna Rzetelski in Sydney.
The Communist League endorsed Joanne Kutiansky in Parramatta.
The Country Party endorsed Helen Dalton in Murray, David Mailler in Northern Tablelands, Paul Funnell in Wagga Wagga and Group V in the Legislative Council.
The Future Party endorsed Group M in the Legislative Council.
The Socialist Equality Party endorsed Oscar Grenfell in Bankstown, Carolyn Kennett in Penrith, James Cogan in Summer Hill and Noel Holt in Wyong.

References
Green, Antony. ABC Election Guide, 2015.
New South Wales Electoral Commission. Candidates list

2015